She Is the Darkness is the seventh novel in Glen Cook's ongoing series, The Black Company. The series combines elements of epic fantasy and dark fantasy as it follows an elite mercenary unit called The Black Company through forty years of its approximately four hundred year history.

Characters in "She Is The Darkness"
 Croaker
 Lady
 Murgen
 One-Eye
 Goblin
 Longshadow
 Soulcatcher
 Mogaba

External links

References

Novels by Glen Cook
1997 American novels
American fantasy novels
Tor Books books